Kelsey Weier (born April 3, 1991) is an American television personality and beauty pageant titleholder. She received national recognition after appearing as a contestant on season 24 of The Bachelor. She was eliminated during week 8 by Peter Weber. She appeared on season 7 of Bachelor in Paradise. She was eliminated week 1. Prior to her television career, Weier had been crowned Miss Iowa USA in 2017.

Personal life 
Weier is originally from West Des Moines, Iowa. Prior to becoming a television personality she attended cosmetology school and worked as a professional color and extensions specialist, as well as a professional clothier for custom clothing company Tom James. She has a younger twin sister Kayla. When she was in the seventh grade her father left the family to start a new life in Mexico. She did not speak to him for 12 years but has since attempted to rekindle their relationship.

Pageantry
Weier began pageantry at a young age after she was encouraged to compete when her youngest sister Kalason competed in Miss Iowa Teen USA a year before, Weier competed in Miss Iowa USA 2015, placed second runner-up to eventual winner Taylor Even, the following year she came back to compete in the same pageant competition, finished first runner-up to eventual winner Alissa Morrison. Weier returned for the following year and won the title as Miss Iowa USA 2017, crowned by outgoing titleholder Morrison.

As Miss Iowa USA 2017, Weier had an opportunity to compete in Miss USA 2017 competition being held at Mandalay Bay Events Center in Las Vegas, Nevada. She did not place in the competition and it was won by Kára McCullough of District of Columbia.

References

External links 

1991 births
American beauty pageant winners
American beauty pageant contestants
American television personalities
American women television personalities
Bachelor Nation contestants
Living people
Miss USA 2017 delegates
People from West Des Moines, Iowa
People from Iowa
Television personalities from Iowa
American twins